The Jacob Trieber Federal Building, United States Post Office, and United States Court House is a historic government building in Helena-West Helena, Arkansas.  It is a Modern International style three-story building, its exterior finished in brick with limestone and granite trim.  It was designed by Edward F. Brueggeman and Elmer A. Stuck & Associates, and built between 1959 and 1961.  It is one of the city's few International style buildings, and has been relatively little altered since its construction.

The building was listed on the National Register of Historic Places as the Federal Building-United States Post Office and Court House in 2015. In 2016, it was renamed for Jacob Trieber, a judge for the Eastern District of Arkansas.

See also
National Register of Historic Places listings in Phillips County, Arkansas

References

Courthouses on the National Register of Historic Places in Arkansas
Government buildings completed in 1961
Buildings and structures in Phillips County, Arkansas
Courthouses in Arkansas
National Register of Historic Places in Phillips County, Arkansas